Kastl Abbey is a former Benedictine  monastery in Kastl in the Upper Palatinate, Bavaria.

History
The monastery, dedicated to Saint Peter, was founded in 1103, or shortly before, by Count Berengar II of Sulzbach together with Frederick and Otto, Counts of Kastl-Habsberg.

It was dissolved in 1563 in the course of the Reformation, but re-established as a Catholic monastery in 1625. From 1636 the building was used by the Jesuits, from 1773 by the Knights Hospitallers. Dissolved again in 1803, it was the seat of the Provincial Court until 1862.

From 1958 to 2006 the buildings housed a Hungarian secondary boarding school, now closed.

Princess Anna

Anna, daughter of Emperor Louis IV, died here on 29 January 1319 aged 18 months. Her body was not taken to Munich but was entombed in the monastery. In 1715 the body was removed from its tomb and kept in an oak cupboard. Later, preserved as a mummy, it lay in a shrine in the entrance hall to the monastery church, where it could be viewed. The body of the princess was recently returned to its tomb to protect it from light damage and a large photo is on display instead.

See also
 List of Jesuit sites

References

Further reading
 Georg Dehio: Handbuch der Deutschen Kunstdenkmäler. Bayern V: Regensburg und die Oberpfalz (ed. Jolanda Drexler, Achim Hubel, Astrid Debold-Kritter et al.), München/Berlin 1991, pp. 238–246
 Stephan Haering: Kastl, Kloster(article). In: Lexikon für Theologie und Kirche, 3rd edn., vol. 5 (1996), col. 1287
 Josef Hemmerle: Die Benediktinerklöster in Bayern (Germania Benedictina 2), Augsburg 1970, pp. 125–129
 Rudolf Wiesneth: Pfalzgräfliche Wirkungsstätten. In: Hans Fischer, Manfred Kindler, Theo Männer, Peter Pauly, Otto Reimer, Rudolf Wisneth (eds.): Festschrift zum Pfalzgraf-Johann-Jahr 1983. Neunburg vorm Wald: Schmiedl 1983, pp. 60–68

External links
 Klöster in Bayern 
 Prinzessin Anna 
 Kastl Hungarian School Alumni Association 

Benedictine monasteries in Germany
Society of Jesus
Knights Hospitaller
Monasteries in Bavaria
Amberg-Sulzbach
1103 establishments in Europe
1100s establishments in the Holy Roman Empire
Religious organizations established in the 1100s
Christian monasteries established in the 12th century